Bloodride is a 2020 Norwegian anthology television series created by Kjetil Indregard and Atle Knudsen and starring Stig R. Amdam, Anna Bache-Wiig and Ellen Bendu. The plot revolves around a bus and its driver, driving in the rain in the middle of the night. In each episode, one of the passengers exits the bus and becomes the focus of the episode.

It was released on Friday 13 March 2020, on Netflix.

Cast
 Stig R. Amdam as Edmund Bråthen
 Anna Bache-Wiig as Iselin
 Ellen Bendu as Sanna
 Bjørn Birch as Herr Kloppen
 Pia Borgli as Margrethe
 Simen Bostad as Marcus
 Mette Spjelkavik Enoksen as Monika
 Elias Er-Rachidi Freuchen as Odd
 Molly Gavin as Sissel
 David Haack as Georg
 Jasmine Haugen as Unni
 Benjamin Helstad as Otto
 Dagny Backer Johnsen as Olivia
 Rebekka Jynge as Kristin
 Sophia Kaushal as Butikkdame
 Karl Vidar Lende as Paul
 Hilde Olausson as Fru Kloppen
 Henrik Rafaelsen as Alex
 Harald Rosenstrøm as Georg
 Kingsford Siayor as Abdi
 Emma Spetalen Magnusson as Katja
 Silje Storstein as Helene
 Bjørnar Teigen as Leon
 Trond Teigen as Philip
 Isabel Beth Toming as Oda
 Erlend Rødal Vikhagen as Erik
 Ingrid Vollan as Fru Kloppen sin vennenne
 Catharina Vu as Bensinstasjonsansatt
 Rj Wayne as Bill
 Ine Marie Wilmann as Molly
 Frode Winther as Rektor Ogland
 Ella Indregard Yttri as Mari
 Ingrid Anne Yttri as Trine
 Ingunn Øien as Agda

Episodes

Release
Bloodride was released on 13 March 2020 on Netflix.

References

External links

Norwegian-language Netflix original programming
2020 Norwegian television series debuts
2020s Norwegian television series